The 2018–19 Beşiktaş J.K. season was the club's 115th year since its foundation, 97th season of competitive football and the club's 60th season contesting the Süper Lig, the top division of Turkish football.  The 2018–19 season lasted from 1 July 2018 to 30 June 2019.

On 19 April 2018, Beşiktaş' Turkish Cup match against Fenerbahçe was abandoned after manager Beşiktaş Şenol Güneş was struck on the head with an object. As a result, the Turkish Football Federation ordered the remaining 32 minutes to be played behind closed doors. However, Beşiktaş refused to travel to the match after an appeal failed. As a result, Beşiktaş was banned from competing in the 2018–19 Turkish Cup.

Squad

Out on loan

Transfers

In

Out

Loans in

Loans out

Released

Competitions

Overview

Süper Lig

League table

Results summary

Results by matchday

Results

UEFA Europa League

Qualifying rounds

Second qualifying round

Third qualifying round

Play-off round

Group stage

Squad statistics

Appearances and goals

|-
|colspan="14"|Players out on loan:
|-
|colspan="14"|Players who left Beşiktaş during the season:

|}

Goal scorers

Disciplinary record

References

Beşiktaş J.K. seasons
Turkish football clubs 2018–19 season
Besiktas